Dufay is a lunar impact crater that is located on the far side of the Moon. It lies about one crater diameter to the east of the large walled plain Mandel'shtam.
To the northwest is the crater Papaleksi and to the east is Valier.

The rim of this crater is heavily worn by impacts, and several small craterlets lie along the southern edge. The inner wall is somewhat wider on the western side when compared to the east and southeast. The interior floor is relatively level and featureless.

Albedo Anomaly

To the northeast of Dufay is a bright albedo anomaly that does not correlate with any topographic features.  The lunar surface at the anomaly is not atypical under low sun angles.  The albedo anomaly is associated with an enhancement in Thorium.

Satellite craters

By convention these features are identified on lunar maps by placing the letter on the side of the crater midpoint that is closest to Dufay.

References

 
 
 
 
 
 
 
 
 
 
 
 

Impact craters on the Moon